Nasarawa United Football Club is a soccer club based in Lafia, Nasarawa. They play in the Nigeria Premier League.

History
The team was founded in 2003 after the Nasarawa government took over Black Stars FC of Gombe. They joined the Nigerian Premier League in 2004–05. Their stadium, Lafia Township Stadium, has a capacity of some 5,000.  The club's nickname is Solid Miners.

2009–10 seasons
The team went through financial shortfalls in the 2008–09 season that one player described as leaving them on the verge of "starvation". A 1–1 home draw on March 7 against Niger Tornadoes caused home fans to riot and even follow the Tornadoes to the hotel and attack them there. The team was sent to play in Ibadan for the rest of the season and assured relegation to the Nigeria National League with three games remaining.
The resulting debt of 46 million naira (Approx. $300,000) threatened to cancel the team's 2009–10 season. Midway through the season, the debt was reportedly 58 million naira ($387,000) and the team missed 16 games due to its precarious financial position. They returned to the field April 24 after a five-month suspension was lifted with a 1–0 win over Mighty Jets.
They were promoted back to the Premier League in 2012 after winning their division.

Achievements
Professional Second Division: 1
2004

Current team
As of 12 February 2023

Performance in CAF competitions
CAF Champions League: 1 appearance
2007 – Second Round

CAF Confederation Cup: 2 appearances
2007 – Intermediate Round
2016 – First Round

Management
Technical Advisor
Kabiru Sulaiman Dogo

Head coach
none

Assistant coach
TBA

Former coaches
 Daniel Amokachi (2006)
 Bitrus Bewarang
 Zachary Baraje (2004–2007)
 Flemming Serritslev (2008–2009)
Muhammad Babaganaru (2013–2005)

References

External links
 Club logo
 Official Website
 Nasarawa Utd In N58m Wage Debt
 Nasarawa Utd pleads to return to League

 
Football clubs in Nigeria
Nasarawa State
2003 establishments in Nigeria
Association football clubs established in 2003
Sports clubs in Nigeria
Mining association football clubs in Nigeria